Llandrindod Wells Victorian Festival, known locally as Victorian Week, is a festival held annually at the end of August in Llandrindod Wells, Powys, central Wales. Many locals and some visitors dress in Victorian, Edwardian or other antique costumes, and many of the town's shops and other high-street businesses dress their windows or otherwise join in the spirit of the event. The event attracted some 40,000 people in 2007. The festival typically offers open-air and street theatre and music, a fairground, craft fair, historical re-enactment, entertainments at the  Albert Hall and exhibitions of old items.

References

External links
Official site
 Facebook page for Victorian Festival

Llandrindod Wells
Festivals in Wales
Cultural festivals in the United Kingdom
Summer festivals
History festivals
Summer events in Wales